Artillery has been one of primary weapons of war since before the Napoleonic Era. Several countries have developed and built artillery systems, while artillery itself has been continually improved and redesigned to meet the evolving needs of the battlefield.  This has led to a multitude of different types and designs which have played a role in the history of warfare and continue to be a significant factor in modern combat.

For the most part, the following lists of artillery cover guns, howitzers, mortars, and other large projectile weapons.  Small arms and missiles are not generally included, though rockets and other bombardment weapons may be.  For a more complete listing of various weapons, see list of weapons.


By name 

 See list of artillery by name

By type 

 See full list of artillery by type or jump to a specific type from the list below:

By caliber 

List of the largest cannon by caliber

By country 

 See full list of artillery by country or jump to a specific country in the table below:



Lists of armoured fighting vehicles